Willie Fung (3 March 1896 – 16 April 1945) was a Chinese-American film actor who played supporting roles in 125 American films between 1922 and 1944. Like many Chinese actors working in Hollywood during the era, he often played Japanese characters.

Biography 
Born in Canton, China, Fung made a name for himself as an actor on the stage in San Francisco. After moving to Los Angeles after his uncle's peanut business collapsed during the depression, Fung — who was reportedly an acquaintance of Jean Harlow's — made his film debut in 1922 in Hurricane's Gal. The majority of his roles were in Westerns and dramas. 

Behind the scenes, he was an advocate for fair treatment of studio actors. While maintaining his acting career, he also ran his own Chinese restaurant: New Moon Café, in East Hollywood. 

Fung died of a coronary occlusion in Los Angeles on April 16, 1945 at the age of 49. He is buried in Angelus-Rosedale Cemetery in Los Angeles.

Career 
Willie Fung experienced racist typecasting throughout his whole career. His failure to thrive past obscurity, lack of proper opportunities, and overall unfreedom were self-fulfilling prophecies caused by a larger pattern of marginalization in the acting world, which limited him to perpetuating harmful racial stereotypes. As Hal Erickson scaldingly put it, "Chinese character actor Willie Fung spent his entire Hollywood career imprisoned by the Hollywood Stereotype Syndrome. ... Fung was the personification of the "Yellow Peril," ... Fung was a buck-toothed, pigtailed, pidgin-English-spouting comedy relief"

Despite being in 125 films over the course of twenty-two years of acting, his time and effort were not rewarded within the system: he was disrespected by his peers while he acted and frowned upon by critics and historians after he acted. 

There is seemingly no information on Willie Fung's personal feelings about his career. Due to lack of interviews, anything he might have personally felt, thought, or said offstage is either lost media, never existed at all, or is second-hand.

Partial filmography

References

External links
 
 Willie Fung at All Movies Guide

Chinese male film actors
Chinese male silent film actors
American male film actors
American male silent film actors
20th-century American male actors
Male Western (genre) film actors
1896 births
1945 deaths
Burials at Angelus-Rosedale Cemetery
Chinese emigrants to the United States
Male actors from Guangdong
Male actors from Guangzhou
20th-century Chinese male actors